"Dover Beach" is a poem by Matthew Arnold.

Dover Beach may also refer to:

Dover Beach (novel), a 1987 novel by Richard Bowker

See also
Dover Beaches North, New Jersey
Dover Beaches South, New Jersey